Apatemon is a genus of flatworms belonging to the family Strigeidae.

The genus was first described by Szidat in 1928.

The genus has cosmopolitan distribution.

Species:
 Apatemon gracilis (Rudolphi, 1819) Szidat, 1928

References

Platyhelminthes